Bornholt is a municipality in the district of Rendsburg-Eckernförde, in Schleswig-Holstein, Germany.

After the local elections in 2013 Wählergemeinschaft KWG holds all seven municipal seats.

References

Municipalities in Schleswig-Holstein
Rendsburg-Eckernförde